Thomas, Michigan may refer to:

 Thomas, Oakland County, Michigan, a historical community in Oxford Charter Township
 Thomas, Tuscola County, Michigan, an unincorporated community in Akron Township